Ralf Brueck (born 1966 Düsseldorf) is a German artist.

Ralf Brueck is a younger exponent of the Düsseldorf School of Photography, which has achieved worldwide renown through Andreas Gursky, Candida Höfer, Thomas Struth and Thomas Ruff, whose master student he became in 2002.
From 1996 to 2003, he studied at the Art Academy Düsseldorf.

Ralf Brueck was one of the last students of the Bernd and Hilla Becher class at the Kunstakademie Düsseldorf before he decided to become a student of Professor Thomas Ruff.
After graduating from the Academy he received the Villa Romana Prize Fellowship in 2004 and lived in Florence, Italy, for 12 months.
There followed several stays abroad in Europe, Asia and the USA between 2005 and 2011.

His large-format images are known for their radical editing. They also refer to pop cultural icons and are supported by their titles i.e. "Personal Jesus", "Pink Mist", "Transmission" and "You don´t look so good".

His earlier works were more influenced by the connection between the Düsseldorf School of Photography and the New American Photography. Since 2009 he has moved towards digital image manipulation. His series TRANSFORMER systematically questions the nature of photography and its representation of reality by isolating particular subjects and altering their proportions. It establishes a new dynamic dialogue between the images and the viewer since what is perceived runs counter to expectations.

2011 marks the beginning of the series DISTORTION which is characterized by a shift of pictorial structures. In DISTORTION Ralf Brueck extracts tonal elements from his works which are parts of the digital texture of the images and changes them by premeditated manipulation. The photographic representations therefore gain a new dimension by transforming the depicted reality.

The structures remind one of barcodes which so to speak expose the DNA of the images.

By this highly calculated use of barcode patterns Brueck contributes to an investigation into constructedness of images and the world itself.

Since 2012 his work has become more radical. His new series DECONSTRUKTION shows a drastic dissolution of images boundaries amounting to their complete destruction.
Ralf Brueck manipulations of images are not geared towards pointing out that contemporary digital photography is deficient in its representation of reality but argues that a photograph constitutes its own reality.

Awards
 2001 Leo Award-Breuer, Rheinisches Landesmuseum Bonn
 2002 Lovell's Arts Award
 2003 NVV studio scholarship, Moenchengladbach
 2004 Villa Romana prize
 2005 NRW Arts Foundation
 2005 Artist Exchange Program between Duesseldorf and Tampere, Finland
 2008 Foundation Art Fund
 2009 Transfer Project, Kulturbuero NRW, Germany
 2010 Organhaus Art Space Residency together with Sichuan Fine Arts Institute, Chongqing, China
 2010 Tapiola Studio Foundation residency, Espoo, Finland
 2010 Thyll-Duerr-Foundation residency, Elba, Italy

Selected exhibitions
 2021 Disappear, Kunst & Denker Contemporary, Duesseldorf, Germany
 2020 Subjekt und Objekt, Kunsthalle Duesseldorf, Germany
 2018 DECONSTRUCTION, Kunst & Denker Contemporary, Duesseldorf, Germany
 2017 TZR Gallery Kai Brückner, Duesseldorf, Germany
 2017  Princehouse Gallery, Mannheim, Germany
 2016 "The typological view, Exhibition for Hilla Becher", Die Photographische Sammlung / SK Stiftung Kultur, Cologne, Germany
 2016 NRW FORUM, Duesseldorf, Germany
 2014 BLOG RE-BLOG Austin Center for Photography, Austin TX
 2013 BLOG RE-BLOG Signal Gallery, New York NY
 2013 Kunstmeile Wangen, Wangen, Germany
 2012 Rethinking Reality, Kuckei + Kuckei, Berlin, Germany
 2011 "DISTORTION THREE", so what gallery, Duesseldorf, Germany
 2011 "DISTORTION TWO", Kunstverein Duisburg, Duisburg, Germany
 2011 "DISTORTION", Gallery Muelhaupt, Cologne, Germany
 2010 "2010 / 2010" Organhaus Sichuan Fine Arts Institute, Chongqing, China
 2009 "ich liebe amerika und amerika liebt mich", Gallery Muelhaupt, Cologne, Germany
 2009 "betonbar: ralf brueck", Mannheim, Germany
 2009 "pain is weakness leaving the body", the bakery, Munich, Germany
 2009 "w", Gallery aplanat, Hamburg, Germany
 2009 "the good times are killing me", Gallery Pitrowski, Berlin, Germany
 2008 "que onda guero", galerie januar ev., Bochum, Germany
 2007 James Harris Gallery, Seattle, US
 2006 "...im Ernst (being serious)", Rheinisches Landesmuseum Bonn, Germany
 2006 "Finnlandfotos1" Goethe Institut Helsinki, Finland
 2005 NVV scholarship end-exhibition, Mönchengladbach, Germany
 2002 Galerie Haus Schneider, Karlsruhe
 2000 Kunstverein Arnsberg, Germany

Works
 "Ralf Brueck", Heart Breaker Magazine
Ralph Goertz (Hrsg.): Ralf Brueck. Deconstruction Distortion DAF Timecapsules. Wienand, Köln 2016, .

References

External links
 Tonermagazine
 Update/News
 Artist's website

Photographers from North Rhine-Westphalia
1966 births
Artists from Düsseldorf
Living people
Kunstakademie Düsseldorf alumni